Major General Kulwant Singh Pannu, MVC was an officer of the Indian Army and a recipient of the Maha Vir Chakra. He was initially commissioned as an officer in the 3 Gorkha Rifles in 1952, and joined the Parachute Regiment in 1957 after completing the paratrooper officers' course. Pannu is most famous for having led 2 Para in the famous Tangail Airdrop to capture the Poongli Bridge over the River Jamuna on 11 December 1971, during the Bangladesh Liberation War. The battalion was airdropped near Tangail (now in Bangladesh) and tasked to cut off the 93 Brigade of Pakistani Army which was retreating from the north to defend Dhaka and its approaches. For his conspicuous gallantry and leadership, Pannu was awarded the Maha Vir Chakra.

Maha Vir Chakra

References

Further reading

Punjabi people
People of the Indo-Pakistani War of 1971
Recipients of the Maha Vir Chakra
Military personnel from Punjab, India
Para Commandos
Living people
Indian military personnel of the Indo-Pakistani War of 1971
1932 births